Victoria Pavilion is a historic grandstand located on the western side of Fremantle Oval, in Fremantle, Western Australia.

In January 1897, local architect Frederick William Burwell won the competition held by the Fremantle Council for the design of a pavilion for Fremantle Oval. Burwell also designed the Central Chambers, Sail and Anchor Hotel, Fowler's Warehouse, Owston's Buildings and Marmion House.

The foundation stone was laid on 25 June 1897 to celebrate Queen Victoria's Diamond Jubilee. Built by Blackman Brothers at a cost of £3650, the pavilion was officially opened by Premier John Forrest on 6 November 1897.

The building is listed on the Register of the National Estate.

References

External links

Buildings and structures in Fremantle
State Register of Heritage Places in the City of Fremantle